is a professional Japanese baseball pitcher for the Saitama Seibu Lions of Nippon Professional Baseball (NPB).

Career
Sasaki was drafted by the Saitama Seibu Lions with the team’s 2nd pick in the 2020 Nippon Professional Baseball draft.

On June 11, 2021, Sasaki made his NPB debut, pitching 2.0 scoreless innings against the Chunichi Dragons. On July 2, Sasaki became the first player in NPB history to be ejected while facing the first batter of the game. His 3rd pitch of the game hit Orix Buffaloes leadoff hitter Shuhei Fukuda in the head, which resulted in an automatic ejection.

References

1996 births
Living people
Saitama Seibu Lions players
Nippon Professional Baseball pitchers